"Angels like You" is a song by American singer Miley Cyrus, from her seventh studio album Plastic Hearts, released on November 27, 2020, through RCA Records. The song was written by Cyrus, Ali Tamposi, Ilsey Juber with the song's producers Louis Bell and Andrew Watt. It was released as the third and final single from the album on March 12, 2021, it was also Cyrus' last single with RCA, ending her contract after 8 years; to sign with Columbia.

A music video for "Angels like You" was released on March 8, 2021. It contains footage taken from Cyrus' Super Bowl pre-game performance on February 7, 2021.

Background
"Angels like You" was originally released on November 27, 2020, alongside Cyrus' seventh studio album Plastic Hearts. A music video for the song was released on March 8, 2021. It impacted contemporary hit radio stations in Australia, as the third single from the album, four days later. British radio station BBC Radio 1 added "Angels like You" to rotation on March 20, and Sony Music sent it to contemporary hit radio stations in Italy on April 9, 2021.

Composition
The lyrics of "Angels like You" were speculated to be about Kaitlynn Carter, who Cyrus previously dated.

Music video
An official music video for "Angels like You" was released on March 8, 2021. The video was recorded on February 7, 2021, at Cyrus' performance at the Super Bowl LV pre-game show. At the end of the video, Cyrus endorsed the COVID-19 vaccine.

Credits and personnel
Credits adapted from Tidal.

 Miley Cyrus vocals, backing vocals, songwriting, executive production
 Andrew Watt songwriting, production, executive production, backing vocals, bass, drums, guitar, keyboards
 The Monsters & Strangerz production, backing vocals, keyboards
 Jordan K. Johnson songwriting
 Marcus Lomax songwriting
 Stefan Johnson songwriting
 Ali Tamposi songwriting
 Jonathan Bellion songwriting, backing vocals, additional production
 Michael Pollack songwriting, backing vocals
 Paul LaMalfa engineering
 Şerban Ghenea mixing
 John Hanes engineering for mix
 Randy Merrill mastering

Charts

Weekly charts

Year-end charts

Certifications

Release history

References

2020s ballads
2020 songs
Miley Cyrus songs
Pop ballads
RCA Records singles
Rock ballads
Song recordings produced by Andrew Watt (record producer)
Song recordings produced by Louis Bell
Songs written by Ali Tamposi
Songs written by Andrew Watt (record producer)
Songs written by Louis Bell
Songs written by Miley Cyrus
Songs written by Ryan Tedder